Shadows of Memories is a 2000 Yugoslav drama film directed by Predrag Velinovic. It was entered into the 22nd Moscow International Film Festival.

Cast
 Velimir 'Bata' Živojinović as Ljuba Radovanovic
 Djurdjija Cvetic as Vera Djordjevic
 Nina Zukanovic as Ema
 Miodrag Radovanovic as Pomocnik rezisera
 Nikola Kojo as Milos
 Nikola Pejakovic as Sima .. postar
 Vera Miljkovic as Bojana
 Radmila Savicevic as Komsinica

References

External links
 

2000 films
2000 drama films
Serbian drama films
2000s Serbian-language films
Yugoslav drama films
Films set in Yugoslavia
Films set in Belgrade